This article shows Sporting CP's player statistics and all matches  that the club plays during the 2014–15 season.

Pre-season and friendlies

Competitions

Overall record

Primeira Liga

League table

Results by round

Matches

Taça de Portugal

Third round

Fourth round

Fifth round

Quarter-finals

Semi-finals

Final

Taça da Liga

Third round

UEFA Champions League

Group stage

UEFA Europa League

Round of 32

Squad statistics

Players

Current squad

Transfers

In

 €2,500,000
 €2,000,000
 €1,000,000
 €500,000
 €1,000,000
 €300,000 (20%)
 €750,000
 €3,800,000
 €1,000,000
 €750,000 (85%)
 €2,900,000
 Loan
 €1,400,000
 Loan, €300,000

Total expending:   €18,200,000

Out

 End of contract
 End of loan
 End of contract
 End of loan
 Free transfer
 Free transfer
 €1,000,000 (35%)
 Loan
 Loan
 Loan
 Loan
 End of loan
 €5,000,000
 €5,000,000 (25%)
 Free Transfer
 Loan
 Free transfer
 Loan

Total income:  €11,000,000

References

External links
 Official club website 

2013-14
Sporting
Sporting Lisbon